Backbone: A Journal of Women's Literature was an American feminist periodical published in Seattle, Washington from 1984 to 1988. 

Originating from the Seal Press's "Backbone Series," which published works by Northwest Women, Backbone became an independent semi-annual magazine with its first issue in 1984. It primarily sought to promote works by women writers from different cultural, social, and economic backgrounds. They published poetry, stories and essays to augment the feminist movement of the 1980s.

In its first issue, the Backbone Collective stated their primary goal with the magazine:

Backbone ceased publication with issue #5 in 1988.

References 

1984 establishments in Washington (state)
1984 disestablishments in Washington (state)
Feminist journals
Literary magazines published in the United States
History of women in Washington (state)